Luis Scatolaro (born 12 February 1963, in Argentina) is an Argentinean retired footballer.

References

Argentine footballers
Living people
Association football forwards
1963 births
Boca Juniors footballers
Club Atlético Belgrano footballers
Chaco For Ever footballers